NGC 433 is an open cluster in the northern constellation of Cassiopeia, located at a distance of 6,500 light years from the Sun. It was discovered on September 29, 1829 by John Herschel, and was described by John Dreyer as "cluster, small, a little compressed." The cluster is considered on the poor side, with only 12 stars above magnitude 16.

References

0433
18290929
Cassiopeia (constellation)
Open clusters